Sher Jehan Mir (Urdu: شیر جہاں میر) is a Pakistani politician and banker. He formerly served as the first caretaker Chief Minister of Gilgit-Baltistan from 12 December 2014 to 26 June 2015. He had also been nominated for the office of Governor of Gilgit-Baltistan in December 2007.

Currently, he is the chairman of the Gilgit-Baltistan Rural Support Program, which is an initiative for poverty alleviation. As a banker, he has also represented Pakistan at multiple forums, including the Bankers Conference in Japan in 1986.

References

Chief Ministers of Gilgit-Baltistan
Pakistani bankers
Politicians from Gilgit-Baltistan
People from Gilgit
Living people
1954 births